T'uruyuq (Quechua t'uru mud, -yuq a suffix, "the one with mud", Hispanicized spelling Toroyoc) is a mountain in the Cordillera Central in the Andes of Peru which reaches an altitude of approximately . It is located in the Lima Region, Yauyos Province, in the districts of Huantan and Laraos. T'uruyuq lies southwest of Lanranyuq and northeast of Wamp'una.

References

Mountains of Peru
Mountains of Lima Region